Clinidium rossi is a species of ground beetle in the subfamily Rhysodinae. It was described by Ross Bell in 1970. It is known from Golfito in Costa Rica. The holotype, a male, measures  in length.

References

Clinidium
Beetles of Central America
Endemic fauna of Costa Rica
Beetles described in 1970